Work It Out With Chet Atkins C.G.P. is the fiftieth studio album by Chet Atkins. After recording for RCA Victor since 1947, Chet left the label to join Columbia. This release is background music for exercising. He was nominated for the 1984 Best Country & Western Instrumental Performance Grammy award for "Tara's Theme" but did not win. It peaked at No. 64 on the Billboard Country Albums charts.

Reception

Writing for Allmusic, critic Richard S.  Ginell wrote of the album "Some of the song choices are as corny as all get out... but the performances are dignified, musical, definitely not throwaways... A most unpretentious, even likeable Columbia debut for Atkins..."

Track listing
 "Warm up Medley: Grandfather’s Clock/Jubilo/Swanee River/Humoresque"
 "Walk Me Home"
 "Strolling Medley: Bicycle Built for Two/Farewell Blues/Bye Bye Blues"
 "Bouree " (Bach)
 "Streakin’ Medley "
 "Tara’s Theme"
 "Cross Country Medley: Take Me Home, Country Roads/Jersey Bounce/"
 "Run, Don’t Walk" (Smith)
 "Harlequin Romance"

Personnel
Chet Atkins - guitar
David Hungate – bass
Randy Goodrum – keyboards

Chart performance

References

Chet Atkins albums
1983 albums
Columbia Records albums